Sampera is a South American genus of flowering plants in the tribe Liabeae within the family Asteraceae.

 Species

References

Asteraceae genera
Liabeae